|}

The Queen Mary Stakes is a Group 2 flat horse race in Great Britain open to two-year-old fillies. It is run at Ascot over a distance of 5 furlongs (1,006 metres), and it is scheduled to take place each year in June.

The event is named after Queen Mary, the consort of King George V. It was established in 1921, and the inaugural running was won by Wild Mint.

The present system of race grading was introduced in 1971, and for a period the Queen Mary Stakes was classed at Group 3 level. It was promoted to Group 2 status in 2004. The Queen Mary Stakes is now staged on day two of the five-day Royal Ascot meeting.

Records
Leading jockey (5 wins):
 Sir Gordon Richards – Supervisor (1932), Maureen (1933), Caretta (1934), Snowberry (1939), Apparition (1946)

Leading trainer (7 wins):
 Fred Darling – Margeritta (1924), Supervisor (1932), Maureen (1933), Caretta (1934), Snowberry (1939), Sun Chariot (1941), Apparition (1946)

Winners since 1978

Earlier winners

 1921: Wild Mint
 1922: Cos
 1923: Mumtaz Mahal
 1924: Margeritta
 1925: Aloysia
 1926: Book Law
 1927: Stadacona
 1928: Arabella
 1929: Qurrat-al-Ain
 1930: Atbara
 1931: Diamalt
 1932: Supervisor
 1933: Maureen
 1934: Caretta
 1935: Fair Ranee
 1936: Night Song
 1937: Queen of Simla
 1938: Belle Travers
 1939: Snowberry
 1940: no race
 1941: Sun Chariot
 1942: Samovar
 1943: Fair Fame
 1944: Sun Stream
 1945: Rivaz
 1946: Apparition
 1947: Masaka
 1948: Coronation V
 1949: Diableretta
 1950: Rose Linnet
 1951: Primavera
 1952: Devon Vintage
 1953: Sybil's Niece
 1954: Bride Elect
 1955: Weeber
 1956: Pharsalia
 1957: Abelia
 1958: A.20
 1959: Paddy's Sister
 1960: Cynara
 1961: My Dream
 1962: Shot Silk
 1963: Lerida
 1964: Brassia
 1965: Visp
 1966: Petite Path
 1967: Sovereign
 1968: Grizel
 1969: Farfalla
 1970: Cawston's Pride
 1971: Waterloo
 1972: Truly Thankful
 1973: Bitty Girl
 1974: Highest Trump
 1975: Rory's Rocket
 1976: Cramond
 1977: Amaranda

* The race was run at Newmarket during the wartime period of 1941–44.

See also
 Horse racing in Great Britain
 List of British flat horse races

References
 Paris-Turf:
 Racing Post:

 galopp-sieger.de – Queen Mary Stakes.
 ifhaonline.org – International Federation of Horseracing Authorities – Queen Mary Stakes (2019).
 pedigreequery.com – Queen Mary Stakes – Ascot.
 

Flat races in Great Britain
Ascot Racecourse
Flat horse races for two-year-old fillies
Recurring sporting events established in 1921
1921 establishments in England